The 1968 United States Senate election in Pennsylvania was held on November 5, 1968. Incumbent Democratic U.S. Senator Joseph S. Clark Jr. sought re-election to a third term but was defeated by Republican U.S. Representative Richard Schweiker.

Democratic primary

Candidates
Joseph S. Clark Jr., incumbent U.S. Senator since 1957
John Herman Dent, U.S. Representative from Greensburg

General election

Candidates
Pearl Chertov (Socialist Workers)
Joseph S. Clark Jr., incumbent U.S. Senator since 1957 (Democratic)
Frank W. Gaydosh (Cosntitution)
Benson Perry (Socialist Labor)
Richard Schweiker, U.S. Representative from Norristown (Republican)

Results

See also 
 United States Senate elections, 1968

References

Pennsylvania
1968
1968 Pennsylvania elections